toonlet is a free website that allows users to create their own cartoon characters and webcomics. Founded in 2007 and opened to public beta in 2008, toonlet differs from other webcomic building tools in that comics are published on the site (or embedded elsewhere) similar to forum or blog posts, meaning they can be replied to.

Using toonlet
The toonlet character tool, which uses Adobe Flash, allows people to build up characters from pre-defined parts which users are also free to supplement with their own. When their character is ready, they can save, and then swap out parts to build up a library of moods or poses to use in their comics. Completed comics are automatically posted in a forum format to the site. Others can reply with their own comic.

Five to ten of the previous day's comics are added to the Top Strips section of the site daily. Comics can be sent to friends via email or embedded onto a blog or website. In addition to other users of toonlet, art packs have been created for the site by comic artists such as Peter Bagge.

History

Headquartered in Portland, Oregon, toonlet was founded in mid-2007 by CEO Craig Schwartz and CTO Seth Ladygo. The two made a beta version of the site live to the public at the end of the year. Previously, Schwartz worked at the video game publisher Electronic Arts as a Producer for The Sims and SimCity video games. Because toonlet hasn't accepted institutional (i.e. venture capital or angel investment) funding, Craig also took a short writing contract for the highly anticipated Spore video game in late 2007. In mid-2008, Schwartz and Ladygo asked friend Ian Schlein to join the company as part-time Community Manager.

References

Sources
  
  

Websites about comics
Companies based in Portland, Oregon
American companies established in 2007
2007 establishments in Oregon
Technology companies established in 2007
Companies disestablished in 2015
Publishing companies disestablished in 2015
Defunct technology companies of the United States